Martin Vaniak (born 4 October 1970 in Ústí nad Labem) is a Czech former football goalkeeper. He played for the Czech national team between 2002 and 2004. He played at club level for several teams, including FK Drnovice, Panionios F.C. in Greece, SK Sigma Olomouc and SK Slavia Prague.

In November 2010 he announced the end of his professional career. In January 2011 however, he changed his mind and stayed at Slavia. After the 2010/2011 season Vaniak however definitely finished his active career.

References

External links
 
 

1970 births
Czech footballers
Czech expatriate footballers
Association football goalkeepers
Living people
Czech Republic international footballers
SK Sigma Olomouc players
SK Slavia Prague players
Panionios F.C. players
FK Baník Most players
Sportspeople from Ústí nad Labem
FK Drnovice players
Czech First League players
Super League Greece players
Expatriate footballers in Greece